Andrina may refer to:
Andrina, feminine version of the Russian last name Andrin
Andrina (film), 1981 movie by Scottish director Bill Forsyth
Andrina (given name):
Andrina Brogden, contestant on Season 13 of American Idol
Andrina Johnston, mother of Vagaland (1909–1973), Shetland poet
Engelina (b. 1978), full name Engelina Andrina Larsen, Danish singer and songwriter
Andrina Curry, fictional DC Comics character; daughter of Aquaman and Mera